Texas Hardtails is a TV series that aired 10 episodes in the United States during 2005. The show aired on the Speed Channel and ran thirty minutes.

Cast and crew
Directed by Brad Kimmel and Jeff Hare, the show's runtime is 30 minutes and features motorcycle builder Rick Fairless. The cast is almost fully made up of Strokers Dallas employees, essentially playing a scripted form of themselves.

The Show's Tagline
"The Somewhat True, Totally Unreal Life and Twisted Times of Rick Fairless."

References

2000s American television series